The Roman Catholic Diocese of Auki is a suffragan diocese of the Roman Catholic Archdiocese of Honiara in the Solomon Islands. It was erected in 1982 from part of the archdiocese.

Bishops
Gerard Francis Loft, S. M. (1983–2004)
Christopher Michael Cardone, O.P. (2004–2016), appointed Archbishop of Honiara
Peter Houhou (2018-)

External links and references

Auki
1982 establishments in the Solomon Islands